Cyperus dentoniae is a species of sedge that is native to Central America and southern parts of North America.

See also 
 List of Cyperus species

References 

dentoniae
Plants described in 1983
Flora of Arizona
Flora of Costa Rica
Flora of El Salvador
Flora of Guatemala
Flora of Honduras
Flora of Mexico
Flora of Nicaragua
Flora of Panama